Martin Dunn (10 May 1883 – 31 December 1942) was an Australian cricketer. He played in four first-class matches for Queensland between 1905 and 1908.

See also
 List of Queensland first-class cricketers

References

External links
 

1883 births
1942 deaths
Australian cricketers
Queensland cricketers
People from Maryborough, Queensland
Cricketers from Queensland